Absa Bank Tanzania Limited (ABT), formerly Barclays Bank Tanzania Limited, is a commercial bank in Tanzania and a subsidiary of South Africa-based Absa Group Limited. ABT is licensed by the Bank of Tanzania, the country's central bank and national banking regulator.

Location
The headquarters and main branch of Barclays Bank of Tanzania Limited are located in Barclays House, along Ohio Street, in the city of Dar es Salaam, the financial capital and largest city of Tanzania. The geographical coordinates of the bank's headquarters are: 06°48'40.0"S, 39°17'12.0"E (Latitude:-6.811111; Longitude:39.286667).

Overview
BBT is a large financial services provider in Tanzanian, serving large corporations, small-to-medium enterprises, and individuals. , its total assets were valued at about TSh 634.34 billion (US$382 million). , BBT had 87,000 customers and 42 automated teller machines, and maintained 24 networked branches.

History
ABT was established in Tanzania in 1925. In 1967, it was nationalized and converted into the National Bank of Commerce, Tanzania's largest bank by assets. With the liberalization of the economy in the 1990s, Barclays Bank Plc re-entered the country, resuming business in 2000.

As at March 2016, Barclays Bank Plc. was seeking regulatory approval in Tanzania to merge this bank with National Bank of Commerce (Tanzania) in which Barclays maintains 55% shareholding.

Name change
In 2016, Barclays Africa Group (BAG) was owned 62.3 percent by Barclays Plc of the United Kingdom. In February that year, Barclays decided to downsize it shareholding in BAG, valued at £3.5 billion, then.
In December 2017, Barclays reduced its shareholding in BAG to 14.9 percent.

In 2018, BAG re-branded to Absa Group Limited.Under the terms of that re-brand, Absa has until June 2020 to change the names of its subsidiaries in 12 African countries.

In Tanzania, the re-brand concluded on 11 February 2020, when both the bank's legal and business names became Absa Bank Tanzania Limited.

Branch network
, the bank maintained a network of 24 branches at the following locations:

 Ohio Street Branch - Barclays House, Ohio Street, Dar es Salaam Main Branch
 Slipway Branch - Msasani, Dar es Salaam
 Magomeni Branch - Magomeni, Dar es Salaam
 Kinondoni Branch - Kinondoni Market, Dar es Salaam
 Mwenge Branch - New Bagamoyo Road, Dar es Salaam
 Mikocheni Branch - Old Bagamoyo Road, Mikocheni, Dar es Salaam
 Pugu Branch - Nyerere Road, Dar es Salaam
 Kisutu Branch - Morogoro Road at Libya Street, Kisutu, Dar es Salaam
 Buguruni Branch - Buguruni, Dar es Salaam
 Uhuru Street Branch - Uhuru Street, Kariakoo, Dar es Salaam
 Arusha Sopa Plaza Branch - Sopa Plaza, Serengeti Road, Arusha
 Arusha TFA Branch - TFA Shopping Center, Arusha
 Mkunguni Street Branch - Mkunguni Street, Kariakoo, Dar es Salaam
 Mbeya Branch -  Mwanjelwa, Mbeya
 Morogoro Branch -  Lumumba Road, Morogoro
 Moshi Branch -  Mawenzi Road, Moshi
 Dodoma Branch - Madukani Road, Dodoma
 Iringa Branch - Iringa
 Mwanza City Centre Branch - Pamba Road, Mwanza
 Tanga Branch - King Street, Tanga
 Zanzibar Main Branch - Zanzibar State Trading Corporation Building, Zanzibar
 Zanzibar Darajani Branch - Darajani Kisiwandui, Zanzibar

See also

 List of banks in Tanzania
 List of banks in Africa
 Bank of Tanzania
 Absa Group Limited
 Barclays Bank Plc

References

Banks of Tanzania
Companies of Tanzania
Economy of Dar es Salaam
Banks established in 1925
Absa Group Limited